Newton is a suburb of Adelaide, South Australia, situated in the Adelaide foothills northeast of the city centre.  The area features a significant population of people of Italian origin. Part of the City of Campbelltown, Newton is surrounded by the suburbs Paradise, Rostrevor, Athelstone and Campbelltown.

Newton is home to such public schools as Thorndon Park Primary School and Charles Campbell College and the private St Francis of Assisi School. The area is also home to chain supermarkets and small shops, most notably Newton Village.

References

Suburbs of Adelaide